Philip Nathaniel Wang Sin Goi (born 22 January 1990) is a British-Malaysian stand-up comedian and comedy writer who is a member of the sketch comedy group Daphne, and co-creator of their BBC Radio 4 series, Daphne Sounds Expensive. He currently hosts the comedy podcast ‘BudPod’ with fellow comedian and Footlights alumnus Pierre Novellie.

Early life
Wang was born in Stoke-on-Trent to an English mother from Stoke and a Chinese-Malaysian father of Hakka descent from Sabah. One week after his birth, his family returned to his father's home town of Kota Kinabalu in Malaysia, where his parents had first met in 1982. His mother, a trained archaeologist, had moved to Malaysia as a volunteer with the Voluntary Service Overseas (VSO). Wang's maternal grandfather was from Derbyshire and became the manager of a tea estate in Assam, India, where his mother spent part of her childhood.

Wang grew up in Malaysia, where he was taught in Malay, Mandarin and English. He took GCSEs at Jerudong International School in Brunei. When he was 16, his family moved back to the UK, to Bath, Somerset.  There he attended Kingswood School. He then studied engineering at King's College, Cambridge, where he was also president of the Cambridge Footlights.

Career
Wang won the 2010 Chortle Student Comedian of the Year Award and, in 2011, Comedy Central's Funniest Student Award. In 2012, he was president of Footlights at Cambridge University, where he did a four-year engineering degree. Wang has since performed at the Edinburgh Festival Fringe and at the Melbourne International Comedy Festival.

Wang has appeared in The Rob Brydon Show, Comedy Up Late, About Tonight, It Was Alright in the 70's, Room 101, Have I Got News for You, Unspun with Matt Forde, Would I Lie to You?, Live at the Apollo, 8 Out of 10 Cats Does Countdown, The Dog Ate My Homework, Hypothetical, Outsiders, and Insert Name Here. He has also acted in the sitcom Top Coppers. In January 2018, he took part in Comedy Central's Roast Battle, hosted by Jimmy Carr, in which he battled friend and fellow comedian Ed Gamble: Wang won the battle.

Wang has recorded two full-length stand-up shows which are available to watch free on his YouTube channel. Wang has also written for The Guardian.

In 2017 Wang appeared in the podcast series Pappy's Flatshare Slamdown and Do the Right Thing.

On 4 July 2018 it was announced that Wang would be one of the contestants in series 7 of Taskmaster. Tasks he won included 'Make the best noise' and 'Most surprisingly beautiful thing'.

Wang is currently working on a stand-up comedy series for BBC Radio 4 titled Wangsplaining. The pilot episode aired on 19 May 2019 on BBC Radio 4.

In 2020, Wang appeared on Kevin McCloud's Rough Guide to the Future.

In December 2020 and May 2022, Wang appeared on Have I Got News For You.

In May 2021, Wang hosted a new podcast called Phil Wang Hates Horror, which was released on Audible.

Wang's Netflix comedy special Phil Wang: Philly Philly Wang Wang was released in August 2021. His first book, Sidesplitter: How to Be from Two Worlds at Once, was published in September 2021.

References

External links
 
 

 
 Page on Chortle with news and tour dates
 CV at agents' page

1990 births
Malaysian people of Chinese descent
Living people
Alumni of King's College, Cambridge
British people of Malaysian descent
English people of Malaysian descent
English male comedians
Malaysian people of Hakka descent
English stand-up comedians
Malaysian people of English descent
People from Stoke-on-Trent
Malaysian people of British descent
Comedians from Staffordshire